Kirki (Kaitag: Хъерхъай; Dargwa: Хъирхъи) is a rural locality (a selo) and the administrative centre of Kirkinsky Selsoviet, Kaytagsky District, Republic of Dagestan, Russia. The population was 174 as of 2010.

Geography 
Kirki is located 29 km southwest of Madzhalis (the district's administrative centre) by road. Turaga and Kuzhnik are the nearest rural localities.

Nationalities 
Dargins live there.

References 

Rural localities in Kaytagsky District